Histoire vraie is a 1973 French film directed by Claude Santelli.

Cast
 Pierre Mondy as Varnetot
 Marie-Christine Barrault as Rose
 Denise Gence as Mère Paumelle
 Claude Brosset as Le fils Paumelle
 Isabelle Huppert as Adelaïde
 Danielle Chinsky as Félicité (as Danièle Chinsky)
 Lucien Hubert as Déboultot
 Henri de Livry as L'oncle
 Sylvie Herbert as La servante de l'oncle
 Fred Personne as Un convive
 Jean Puyberneau as Un convive
 Marcel Rouzé as Un convive

See also
 Isabelle Huppert on screen and stage

References

External links

1973 films
French television films
1970s French-language films
Films directed by Claude Santelli
1970s French films